Lev Dmitriyevich Burchalkin (born January 9, 1939 in Leningrad; died September 7, 2004 in St. Petersburg) was a Soviet football player and Russian coach.

Honours
 Holds FC Zenit St. Petersburg records for league appearances (400) and goals (78).

International career
Burchalkin played his only game for USSR on May 20, 1964 in a friendly against Uruguay.

References

External links
  Profile

1939 births
2004 deaths
Soviet footballers
Soviet Union international footballers
Soviet Top League players
FC Zenit Saint Petersburg players
Russian football managers
Russian footballers
Footballers from Saint Petersburg
FC Luch Vladivostok managers
Expatriate football managers in the Maldives
FC Zenit Saint Petersburg managers
Victory Sports Club managers
FC Shakhter Karagandy managers
FC Kosmos-Kirovets Saint Petersburg managers
FC Lokomotiv Saint Petersburg managers
FC Pskov-2000 managers
Recipients of the Medal of the Order "For Merit to the Fatherland" II class
Association football forwards
Burials at Serafimovskoe Cemetery